Etymologicum Magnum (standard abbreviation EM, or Etym. M. in older literature) is the traditional title of a Greek lexical encyclopedia compiled at Constantinople by an unknown lexicographer around 1150 AD. It is the largest Byzantine lexicon and draws on many earlier grammatical, lexical and rhetorical works. Its main sources were two previous etymologica, the so-called Etymologicum Genuinum and the Etymologicum Gudianum. Other sources include Stephanus of Byzantium, the Epitome of Diogenianus, the so-called Lexicon Αἱμωδεῖν (Haimōdeῖn), Eulogius’ Ἀπορίαι καὶ λύσεις (Ἀporίai kaὶ lύseis), George Choeroboscus’ Epimerismi ad Psalmos, the Etymologicon of Orion of Thebes, and collections of scholia. The compiler of the Etymologicum Magnum was not a mere copyist; rather he amalgamated, reorganised, augmented and freely modified his source material to create a new and individual work.

The editio princeps of the Etymologicum Magnum was published by Zacharias Kallierges and Nikolaos Vlastos under the patronage of Anna Notaras at Venice in 1499. The typeface was designed and cut by Kallierges, modeled on his own handwriting. The decorative initial letters and headpieces are patterned on the decorations of the Byzantine manuscript tradition, and the woodcut borders incorporate elaborate arabesque designs, usually colored white on red, but also white on gold. The decorations of the Kallierges edition had a great influence in printing, especially on Greek liturgical books.

The most recent complete edition is by Thomas Gaisford (Oxford 1848). A new (uncompleted) edition is in preparation  by F. Lasserre and N. Livadaras (under the title Etymologicum Magnum Auctum).

References

Bibliography
K. Alpers (1990), ‘Griechische Lexicographie in Antike und Mittelalter. Dargestellt an ausgewählten Beispielen’ in H.-A. Koch and A. Krup-Eber (eds.), Welt der Information. Wissen und Wissensvermittlung in Geschichte und Gegenwart (Stuttgart) 14-38.
K. Alpers (2001), ‘Lexicographie (B.I-III)’ in G. Üding and W. Jens (eds.), Historisches Wörterbuch der Rhetorik 2 (Tübingen) 194-210.
P. Rance, (2007), ‘The Etymologicum Magnum and the “Fragment of Urbicius”’, Greek, Roman and Byzantine Studies 47:193-224 (online)
R. Reitzenstein (1897), Geschichte der griechischen Etymologika: ein Beitrag zur Geschichte der Philologie in Alexandria und Byzanz (Leipzig; repr. Amsterdam 1964). 
F. W. Sturz (1820), Orionis Thebani Etymologicon (Leipzig).

External links
Etymologicon magnum seu magnum grammaticae penu, Friderici Sylburgii (ed.), editio nova correctior, Lipsiae apud Io. Aug. Gottl. Weigel, 1816.
 Etymologicon magnum, Thomas Gaisford (ed.), Oxonii, E. Typographeo academico, 1848.

1150s books
Ancient Greek dictionaries
Byzantine Greek encyclopedias
Etymological dictionaries
Works about philology